Parmouti 8 - Coptic Calendar - Parmouti 10

The ninth day of the Coptic month of Parmouti, the eighth month of the Coptic year. In common years, this day corresponds to April 4, of the Julian Calendar, and April 17, of the Gregorian Calendar. This day falls in the Coptic Season of Shemu, the season of the Harvest.

Commemorations

Saints 

 The departure of Saint Zosima the Priest

Other commemorations 

 The commemoration of the Sign that took place by the hands of Pope Shenouda I, 55th Patriarch of the See of Saint Mark

References 

Days of the Coptic calendar